UB3 may refer to:

 UB3, a postcode district in the UB postcode area
 SM UB-3, World War I German submarine